is a Japanese Transformers line of toys and anime series that ran from April 12, 1988 to March 7, 1989 for 42 episodes. On July 3, 2006 the series was released on DVD in the UK, and it was aired on AnimeCentral in the UK a few years later. In 2008, Madman Entertainment released the series on DVD in Australia in Region 4, PAL format. On May 1, 2012, the series was released on DVD in the US. It serves as  the second sequel series to the Japanese dub of the original The Transformers cartoon series as part of the Generation 1 franchise, preceded by Transformers: The Headmasters and followed by Transformers: Victory.

Story
The core concept of Masterforce begins with the human beings themselves rising up to fight and defend their home, rather than the alien Transformers doing it for them. Going hand-in-hand with this idea, the Japanese incarnations of the Autobot Pretenders actually shrink down to pass for normal human beings, whose emotions and strengths they value and wish to safeguard. The Decepticon Pretenders tend to remain large monsters, unless they battle in their robot forms. Later on children and adults would be recruited to become Headmaster Juniors for both the Autobots and Decepticons but as the story progressed the story focuses more on the Godmasters (released as Powermasters in the West) and they became the more powerful Transformers on the show. The Godmasters themselves are human beings with the ability to merge with their Transtectors (robot bodies). Most of the Godmasters would be adults with the exception of Clouder who is about the same age as the Junior Headmasters. Other characters would later appear including Black Zarak who would later merge with the Decepticons leader; Devil Z for the final battle and for the Autobots comes Grand Maximus who has a Pretender guise and is Fortress Maximus' younger brother. Also the Firecons make a brief appearance in one episode and a robot who transforms into a gun (similar to G1 Megatron) was given to Cancer of the Headmaster Junior Decepticons as a gift from Lady Mega. His name was Browning (or BM in the dub). The Decepticons also had the Targetmaster Seacons under their command, but like the Pretenders, they were sentient robots and didn't require humans to operate them. The Autobots would also gain the help of another sentient robot called Sixknight (Or as he is known outside Japan; Quickswitch), who appeared on Earth as a travelling warrior who wanted to challenge Ginrai (who is the Godmaster of the body of Optimus Prime) to a battle, but soon decided for himself to fight for the Autobots cause.  The story basically tells the efforts of the heroic Autobot forces as they protect the Earth from the Decepticons. Only this time round, human characters played a more important role than in other Transformers series.

Development
With the conclusion of the US Transformers cartoon series in 1987, Japan produced their first exclusive anime series, Transformers: The Headmasters, to replace the fourth and final US season and to carry out the story concepts begun in The Transformers: The Movie and carried on through the third season, using the existing cast and adding the eponymous Headmasters into the mix. With the completion of the series, the evil Decepticons had finally been forced off Earth, and the stage was set for the beginning of Super-God Masterforce.

Although nominally occurring in the same continuity as the previous Transformers series, there was a very obvious effort on head writer Masumi Kaneda's part to make Masterforce a "fresh start" as a mecha story, introducing an entirely new cast of characters from scratch, rather than using any of the previous ones. To this end, although the toys are mostly the same in both Japan and the West (barring some different color schemes), the characters which they represent are vastly different—most prominently, Powermaster Optimus Prime's counterpart is Ginrai, a human trucker who combines with a transtector (a non-sentient Transformer body, a concept lifted from Headmasters) to become a Transformer himself, the same applies to the other Powermasters' counterparts; the Godmasters. The Pretender figures released during that year were the same but in Masterforce the Autobot pretenders disguise themselves regular sized humans that can wear normal clothing instead of being giant humans wearing armor as they were in contemporary Marvel comics.

The attempt to start things afresh with Masterforce does give rise to some continuity quirks, however, such as Earth technology being portrayed as contemporary, rather than futuristic as in 2010 and Headmasters, and some characters being totally unaware of what Transformers are, even though they have been public figures for over two decades. Similarly, the show never supplied the viewer with the full backstory - within the main 42 episodes of the series, important aspects such as what the true villain, Devil Z is or who BlackZarak is are never explained. Even the timeframe of the show was never revealed, with the series taking place an indeterminate amount of time after Headmasters. Most of these facts would all be revealed later in made-for-video clip shows and other media, including a Special Secrets episode where both Shuta and Grand Maximus would explain and reveal several pieces of trivia about the show.

Adaptations
The series was dubbed into English in Hong Kong by the dubbing company; Omni Productions, for broadcast on the Malaysian TV channel, RTM1 along with Headmasters and the following series, Victory. These dubs, however, are more famous for their time on the Singapore satellite channel, Star TV, where they were grouped under the umbrella title of "Transformers Takara", and all given Victory's opening sequence. Later acquired by the US Transformers animated series creator Sunbow Productions, they were given English-language closing credits (even including the English Transformers theme), but no official release of them has ever been carried in the US, because of their poor quality. Performed by a small group (less than half-a-dozen actors), the dubs feature many incorrect names and nonsensical translations - in the case of the Masterforce, especially, all the English-equivalent names are used for the characters, so throughout the series, the clearly human Ginrai is referred to as "Optimus Prime", and the little blonde girl called Minerva is referred to by the inappropriate name "Nightbeat".

In 2006, the complete series was released in Region 2 with the Japanese audio with subtitles (although like Shout! Factory, it does not contain the English dub). For the Shout! Factory release, the Cybertronians are still referred to as Autobots and the Destrons are still known as the Decepticons, and many of the characters are given the names of the American releases of their toys.

A twelve-chapter manga adaptation of this anime was written by Masami Kaneda and illustrated by Ban Magami.

Theme songs
 Openings
 
 April 12, 1988 - March 7, 1989
 Lyricist: Machiko Ryu / Composer: Masahiro Kawasaki / Arranger: Masahiro Kawasaki / String Arranger: Tomoyuki Asakawa / Singers: Toshiya Igarashi
 Episodes: 1–47

 Endings
 
 April 12, 1988 - March 7, 1989
 Lyricist: Machiko Ryu / Composer: Masahiro Kawasaki / Arranger: Masahiro Kawasaki/ String Arranger: Tomoyuki Asakawa / Singers: Toshiya Igarashi, Mori no Ki Jido Gassho-dan
 Episodes: 1–47

 Insert Songs
 
 September 13, 1988, November 1, 1988, November 15, 1988, December 6, 1988
 Lyricist: Machiko Ryu / Composer: Masahiro Kawasaki / Arranger: Masahiro Kawasaki / Singers: Toshiya Igarashi
 Episodes: 20, 27, 29, 32
 
 September 27, 1988, November 8, 1988
 Lyricist: Machiko Ryu / Composer: Masahiro Kawasaki / Arranger: Masahiro Kawasaki / Singers: Toshiya Igarashi
 Episodes: 22, 28
 "WE BELIEVE TOMORROW"
 December 13, 1988, February 28, 1989
 Lyricist: Machiko Ryu / Composer: Komune Negishi / Arranger: Kimio Nomura / Singers: Toshiya Igarashi
 Episodes: 33, 42
 
 Lyricist: Machiko Ryu / Composer: Komune Negishi / Arranger: Katsunori Ishida / Singers: Toshiya Igarashi
 Episodes: 34, 39
 
 Lyricist: Machiko Ryu / Composer: Masahiro Kawasaki / Arranger: Kimio Nomura / Singers: Toshiya Igarashi
 Episodes: None
 
 Lyricist: Kayoko Fuyusha / Composer: Komune Negishi / Arranger: Katsunori Ishida / Singers: Yumi Toma, Hiroko Emori, Yuriko Yamamoto
 Episodes: None
 
 Lyricist: Kayoko Fuyusha / Composer: Komune Negishi / Arranger: Katsunori Ishida / Singers: Masato Hirano
 Episodes: None
 
 Lyricist: Machiko Ryu / Composer: Komune Negishi / Arranger: Katsunori Ishida / Singers: Toshiya Igarashi
 Episodes: None

Episodes

Chapters

Characters

References

External links
Transformers Japanese Collection: Super-God Masterforce at Shout! Factory

1988 anime television series debuts
1988 manga
1989 comics endings
Adventure anime and manga
Manga series
Nippon TV original programming
Japanese television series based on American television series
Super robot anime and manga
Television shows set in Japan
Television series set in the 2010s
Super-God Masterforce
Super-God Masterforce
Toei Animation television